Eremophila jucunda subsp. pulcherrima is a plant in the figwort family, Scrophulariaceae and is endemic to Western Australia.  It is a small shrub with grey, hairy leaves and sepals and blue or mauve flowers often growing in stony places. It is similar to subspecies jucunda but is distinguished from it by its grey new growth and more northerly distribution.

Description
The young leaves and branches are grey-coloured.

The 5 petals form a tube  which is glabrous on the outer surface.

Taxonomy and naming
Eremophila jucunda subsp. pulcherrima was first described by Robert Chinnock in 2007. The epithet pulcherrima is a Latin word meaning "prettiest.

Distribution and habitat
This eremophila grows on rocky hils or on clay flats between Paraburdoo and Newman.

ConservationEremophila jucunda subspecies pulcherrima'' is classified as "not threatened" by the Western Australian Government Department of Parks and Wildlife.

References

jucunda pulcherrima
Plants described in 2007
Plant subspecies